Themes of Christianity in rap music refers to the use of lyrics, messages and images relating to the religion of Christianity within the genre of Hip-Hop and Rap music. Christianity has influenced some of the most influential and biggest names in Rap, including Chance the Rapper, Kanye West, Kendrick Lamar and J. Cole. While these names, along with others do not necessarily preach Christianity, it is clear that their lyrics and themes are heavily influenced by the religion.

Hip hop music refers to a genre that arose in the 1970s, and expanded into a larger culture and one of the most popular genres in the world. Rap, an essential part of Hip-Hop music, refers to the practice of speaking lyrics over a beat. Themes in Hip-Hop and Rap can involve anything, and tend to vary, but are not limited, by the region from which the rapper originates. Los Angeles, and more specifically, Compton rappers, including 2Pac, Snoop Dogg, YG, and Kendrick Lamar, tend to fall under the category of "gangsta" rap, speaking on themes of violence, as well as partying in the inner city. However, New York rappers, such as Notorious B.I.G., Nas, and Joey Bada$$ have created a genre characterized by thoughtful, and careful lyrics along with delivery. While the themes in rap music tend to center around certain ideas, artists from all over the country have incorporated ideas relating to Christianity in their music.

Christianity is a monotheistic religion based on the teaching of Jesus Christ. Common themes within Christianity include miracles, repentance of transgressions, the positive qualities and effects of God himself, and people’s destination following their life on earth, referring to Heaven and Hell.

Gospel Influence

Kanye West's The College Dropout 
Released in 2004, Kanye West's debut album The College Dropout was revolutionary in terms of both production and lyrics. The "chipmunk soul" beats sampled classic soul songs to create entirely unique sounds, and West's lyrics varied greatly from the trends of gangsta rap, the prevalent genre at the time. The most prominent single on the album that references Christianity very explicitly was “Jesus Walks.” This single was seen as a bold, open embracement of faith, as the sample of ARC Choir, “Walk With Me” is the backbone of the instrumental. Repeated throughout the track is “Jesus walk with me,” conveying West’s desire to be closer to Jesus. Furthermore, West raps over the track, repeating in a sort of chorus, “I wanna talk to God but I’m afraid cause we ain’t spoke in so long,” as well as “God show me the way because the Devil’s trying to break me down.” In these lines, West refers to God specifically, wanting to talk to him, but not being able to as a result of fear, and temptations from “the Devil.” Kanye goes on to talk about how everyone should be connected and talking to Jesus, even the “Hustlers, killers, murderers, drug dealers, even the  / Jesus walks with them.” Kanye raps about how he believes everyone should have some sort of savior in their life, and goes on in the song to talk about how his way of life is slowly deteriorating, and that only Jesus can save him at this point. He fears the situation because he believes that his generation, and more specifically the rappers in his generation are “almost nearly extinct.” West also points to his impact in the rap industry, highlighting exactly the impact his album made. West raps, “They say you can rap about anything except for Jesus.” Kanye West released an extremely religion-based song, and album altogether, in a largely considered secular industry of music. Later on in the album, Kanye also brings in an interlude entitled “I’ll Fly Away,” which also happens to be a very popular gospel song, covered many times by many artists of the Christian faith.

Chance The Rapper: Coloring Book 
Coloring Book is the third mixtape from Chicago artist Chance the Rapper. According to Jon Caramanica of the New York Times, Chance comes “as close as anyone has to eradicating the walls between the sacred and the secular.” At many points throughout the project, Chance connects with his deep-rooted sense of spirituality, at one point sampling Chris Tomlin’s vocals on “How Great is Our God” as an intro to the song “How Great.” Chance also refers to “blessings” on the track “Blessings”, saying, “When the praises go up, the blessings come down.” Chance goes onto the reprise of “Blessings” questioning his listeners by asking, “Are you ready for your miracle?” On a song unreleased on the album due to copyright issues entitled, “Grown Ass Kid,” Chance talks about his identity as a rapper in a largely secular industry, saying, “My favorite rapper a christian rapper.” His self given identity as a Christian rapper speaks to his major influences from religion, mainly stemming from his connection to Kanye West, both as believers of Christianity, and Chicago Natives. In Jon Caramanica’s same New York Times article, he speaks on the identity Chance has created for himself. “The pop song is the praise song.” Chance the Rapper has introduced his style of heavy religious themes, and turned them into songs that many have listened to and enjoyed, as it received 4 stars from Rolling Stone, a 9.1/10 on Pitchfork, and a rating of XL on XXL.

Themes of Christianity

good kid m.A.A.d city 
With a more subtle approach to incorporating religious themes, Compton-based rapper Kendrick Lamar deals more with the practical applications of religion in life. His album, good kid, m.A.A.d city, released in 2012, is a narrative on the life that Lamar lived within Compton, and the exposure at a young age to violence, alcohol, drug abuse, and other crime. Kendrick speaks to the fact that so many people in the younger generation are exposed to things like violence, and are forced to numb their pain with various methods, which he goes into great depth explaining his own personal struggle with those things. However, Kendrick points to religion as a healthy way to find relief from the pain that they may feel. The intro to the album begins with two male voices, reciting a prayer asking for forgiveness. In this prayer, the two males pray about how they, “humbly repent for [their] sins” and thank God for, “saving [them] with [His] precious blood.” Throughout this album, Kendrick highlights the idea of repentance for a life of sin, talking about how he is a “sinner, who’s probably gonna sin again” and constantly asking that the “lord forgive” for “things [he doesn’t] understand” in the song “Bitch Don’t Kill My Vibe.” While not as explicit, Kendrick encourages those hearing his music to focus their search for relief for the pain of life to something healthy, like religion and Christianity, stressing the idea of repentance, turning away from the life of sin.

Born Sinner 
Born Sinner, a 2013 release from North Carolina rapper Jermaine Cole (J. Cole) is the storyline of an adolescent, dealing with the peer pressure and the conflicting beliefs of Christianity. With many references to Christianity and church, J. Cole uses religion as a backdrop to a larger conflict. The second track on the album, entitled Kerney Sermon (Skit), is an excerpt from Pastor Kerney Thomas, a televangelist who promotes miracles through things like prayer. In this skit, Pastor Thomas preaches that his suffering was relieved through prayer, and ordering the “personal prayer package,” and in doing so, is also advertising this miracle for the listeners. The next track, “Land of the Snakes,” highlights the adolescent wrongdoing that the character in the album gets into. J. Cole shows that Christianity and those values are center to this character, who could be himself, as he says in the chorus of the song, “She said we bout to miss church while she riding me.” J. Cole shows that these values are important, and that he thinks about them, but oftentimes his youthful desires can get in the way of that. Another interlude in the song reveals that the character, who is given the name Jermaine, is missing more than just church. On “Where’s Jermaine? (Skit),” a church choir is practicing, when they realize that “Jermaine” is not there at the practice, and everyone begins to search for him. On the final song of the album, entitled “Born Sinner,” J. Cole reflects on his life, and how he has never been able to connect with his religious beliefs. He pleads, saying, “Never got to church to worship Lord but please be merciful,” connecting back to the teenager in the storyline of the album up to that point. J. Cole also reflects on his weaknesses as a somewhat religious person, calling himself a “born sinner” and a “sucker for women licking they lips and holding these purses,” connecting to the teenager that was so easily tempted and swayed away from his beliefs in God. J. Cole also gives himself a goal, and a determination to improve himself, and strengthen his connection to Christianity, and ultimately God himself, saying, “I’m a born sinner, but I’ll die better than that, I swear.” Regardless of his past life of sin, or however easily tempted away from his religion he is, J. Cole plays with the idea of repentance, and the idea that he can improve himself.

The Life of Pablo 
Kanye West called his 2016 release, entitled “The Life of Pablo,” “A gospel album, with a whole lot of cursing on it.” Whether sampling Pastor T.L. Barrett’s “Father I Stretch My Hands,” a solemn gospel song, or explicitly talking about the need for “faith” on “Ultralight Beam,” Kanye embraces his spiritual beliefs, and expresses them freely, and in a manner that can contradict the values of Christianity itself. The first track on the album, entitled “Ultralight Beam” which features Chance the Rapper, another Chicago-native, and religious rapper, is a song that contains many explicit references to Christianity. The track begins with a child, imitating a preacher, talking about how there will be no “devil’s in the house” and how their family only “want[s] the lord.” The song’s chorus includes lines such as “This is a God dream, this is everything,” and “I’m tryna keep my faith, but I’m looking for more.” Kanye refers specifically to seeking out faith, and seeking his own connection to God. Chance the Rapper’s verse includes many more explicit references to Christianity. Chance raps, “Foot on the devil’s neck ‘til it drifted Pangea” referring Saint Michael the Archangel. This angel, in the bible, is the one to lead the army that defeated the army of Satan. Chance’s image of his “foot on the Devil’s neck” is a reference to that victory, but he adds in his own idea, that the defeat of Satan would unite people all over the world, similar to Pangea, the supercontinent that connected every land mass, and in Chance’s image, would connect all people, regardless of origin or location. Chance also refers to his relationship with Christianity and music, as he mentions a single from a previous project of his, called “Sunday Candy.” In this single, he talks about his grandmother, and her influence on his spiritual beliefs, as she would always take him to church on Sunday. Chance talks about this in “Ultralight Beam,” saying “I made Sunday Candy, I’m never going to hell.” The fact that Chance makes such religious-based music, and conveys that message to people, in his mind, puts him into heaven. The outro to the song includes a feature from Kirk Franklin, a well-known gospel artist. His outro is spoken, and is a “prayer” for everyone and anyone. He prays that everyone who feels too far away from God or religion can come back. Kanye plays with the idea of repentance here, and encourages people with the idea that no one can be too far gone.

Negative views of Christianity 
Rappers have also criticized religion through their music, one example of which being A$AP Rocky on his album “AT.LONG.LAST.A$AP,” and more specifically, the track entitled “Holy Ghost.” A$AP Rocky speaks on his view of Christianity and looks at his personal relationship with it, saying, “They ask me why I don’t go to church no more, cause church is the new club.” A$AP draws the comparison between the club, and church, directly comparing religion and spirituality with a wild lifestyle. A$AP shows that he believes both lifestyles can have positive aspects, and negative. Both can be used to feel better about oneself, and both can essentially ruin someone’s life. A$AP goes on to talk about how Christianity attempts to “dine us with some damn wine and crackers.” When rapping this, he points to the idea that religion is shallow, and attempts to put faith in small things, or beliefs, as opposed to addressing real issues. However, he seemed to recant some of these views in his 2018 single "Praise the Lord (Da Shine)". According to A$AP, he is more spiritual than religious, and attests to his childhood in a "Christian household" for establishing his own relationship with God.

See also 

https://newrepublic.com/article/135723/hip-hop-hymnals

https://divinity.uchicago.edu/sightings/everywhere-ferguson-and-socio-religious-challenge-hip-hop-culture-james-samuel-logan.

http://www.chicagotribune.com/entertainment/music/ct-rap-music-gospel-ae-0605-20160602-story.html.

References 

Contemporary Christian music
Hip hop
Christianity and society in the United States